Arichandranathi River is a river flowing in the Tiruvarur district of the Indian state of Tamil Nadu.

See also
 List of rivers of Tamil Nadu

References

Rivers of Tamil Nadu
Tiruvarur district
Rivers of India